Dimitris Perrikos (born December 1935 in Piraeus, Greece) is a Greek chemist working for the United Nations since 1975. He was the second Chairman of the United Nations Monitoring, Verification and Inspection Commission (UNMOVIC), succeeding Dr. Hans Blix in June 2003, and serving until UNMOVIC's dissolution in 2007. He is the son of the Greek Air Force officer and Resistance fighter Kostas Perrikos, founder of PEAN.

References 

1935 births
Living people
People from Piraeus
National and Kapodistrian University of Athens alumni
Greek chemists
Greek officials of the United Nations